Mixibius is a genus of water bear or moss piglet, a tardigrade in the class Eutardigrada.

Species
 Mixibius fueginus Pilato and Binda, 1996
 Mixibius ninguidus Biserov, 1999
 Mixibius ornatus Pilato, Binda, Napolitano and Moncada, 2002
 Mixibius saracenus (Pilato, 1973)
 Mixibius sutirae Pilato, Binda and Lisi, 2004

References

External links

Parachaela
Tardigrade genera
Polyextremophiles